USS C. W. Morse (ID 1966) was a paddle wheel steamer built in 1903, which was leased by the U.S. Navy for service during World War I. She served as a receiving ship in New York harbor during the war.  Post-war she was decommissioned and returned to her former owner.

Hudson River steamer 

C. W. Morse (No. 1966) was a 4307 gross ton paddle-wheel river passenger steamship which the Navy chartered during World War I. She was built in 1903 by Harlan and Hollingsworth at Wilmington, Delaware, for commercial employment on the Hudson River, New York.

On 30 April 1907 in fog conditions the C. W. Morse collided with the tugboat/lighter New York Central No. 4. The tug sank immediately. No one on board the Morse was injured, while the Engineer of the tug was drowned. Survivors were picked up by the Morse and by another tug. No blame for the accident was given, This was appealed in 1909, where both ships were found at fault and each responsible for half the damages.

World War I service 

On 12 December 1917 she was chartered by the Navy and placed in service as C.W. Morse (ID # 1966) in the 3rd Naval District in the New York City area as a receiving ship. She was returned to her owner on 10 February 1919.

Post-war decommissioning 

After World War I era use, she was returned to her owners in February 1919.
She continued to sail on the Hudson until 1927. In 1928 the then owner, Hudson River Navigation Corp. kept her docked to reduce their line's operating costs. In 1930-31 large amounts of equipment and fittings were transferred to the other three ships of the line. She was formally scrapped in 1935, while her hull was used as a breakwater in Bridgeport, Connecticut.

References 

 
 C.W. Morse (American River Passenger Steamer, 1903). Served as USS C.W. Morse (ID # 1966) in 1917-1919

Ships built by Harlan and Hollingsworth
1903 ships
World War I auxiliary ships of the United States
Steamships of the United States Navy
Ships sunk as breakwaters